Cierra Alexa Ramirez (born March 9, 1995) is an American actress and singer. She is best known for playing Mariana Adams Foster in the Freeform television series The Fosters and reprising her role in the spin-off series Good Trouble, which she also co-executive produced with co-star Maia Mitchell. Her accolades include an ALMA Award, an Imagen Foundation Award and a GLAAD Media Award nomination.

Early life
Ramirez was born on March 9, 1995, in Houston, Texas. Her father, Sonny Ramirez, was a music producer and her mother, Cris Ramirez, was a kindergarten teacher. Ramirez was raised in Sugar Land, Texas, and attended Westside High School for two years before moving to Los Angeles, California. She graduated high school through a home-school program to allow her to pursue her acting career.

Career

Music
Music led to Ramirez making her television debut—when she was 10 years old, she performed a song the "Apollo Kids Star of Tomorrow" segment of Showtime at the Apollo. Ramirez is signed to Empire and Tribeca Music Group. She has performed as the opening act for a number of musical acts, including Earth, Wind & Fire, Chicago and Ruben Studdard.

On June 20, 2016, Ramirez released her first EP Discreet. Her singles subsequently followed her first EP: "Faded" Feat. Baeza in 2017.

In 2018, Ramirez released the first single “Bad Boys” off of her debut album, Over Your Head, which was released February 28, 2020. Singles that followed “Bad Boys” were; “Liquid Courage (Love Me Better)", "Broke Us" Feat. Trevor Jackson in 2019 and “Over Your Head” in 2020.

Music videos for the singles "Faded", "Bad Boys", "Liquid Courage" and "Broke Us" were released. "Liquid Courage (Love Me Better)", "Broke Us", and “BBU” were directed by Maria Skobeleva.

Acting
In 2007, Ramirez played a recurring role on the Disney Channel series The Suite Life of Zack & Cody as Jasmine, a young camper with anger management issues. Ramirez played recurring character Kathy in The Secret Life of the American Teenager, introduced in the 100th episode as a pregnant freshman.

Ramirez had her film debut in the titular role for the 2012 feature film Girl in Progress, for which she won an ALMA Award for Favorite Movie Actress Supporting Role.

Starting in 2013, Ramirez played Mariana Foster in the ABC Family (renamed "Freeform" channel) series The Fosters. Her character is a straight-A student who, with her fraternal twin Jesus, has been adopted by a lesbian couple into a multi-ethnic blended family. The show premiered on June 3, 2013, and in January 2017, Freeform announced that it had been renewed for its fifth season. However, according to Entertainment Weekly, the series would be cancelled after a three-night limited series on June 6, 2018, to be followed with a spin off, Good Trouble premiering January 9, 2019, featuring Ramirez and Maia Mitchell.

Personal life
She is of Colombian and Mexican descent.

Discography

Albums

Extended plays

Singles

Other appearances

Music videos

Filmography

Film

Television

Awards and nominations

References

External links
 

1995 births
Living people
American people of Colombian descent
American actresses of Mexican descent
American musicians of Mexican descent
American child actresses
American child singers
American film actresses
American television actresses
21st-century American actresses
Actresses from Houston
People from Sugar Land, Texas
21st-century American singers
Hispanic and Latino American actresses
Hispanic and Latino American musicians
Hispanic and Latino American women singers